Hershey's Cookies 'n' Mint is a candy bar manufactured by The Hershey Company. The bar is a flat, green candy bar containing bits of small uniformly-shaped mint-flavored cookie bits. It was introduced in 1994, then was discontinued. The bar was brought back in 2005, and was discontinued again, only to be brought back in 2020.

History 
The Hershey's Cookies 'n' Mint candy bar was first introduced by The Hershey Company in 1994.

Nutrition information

References

External links 

 Hershey's Cookies 'n' Mint product details

 

The Hershey Company brands
Products introduced in 1994
Candy bars